Champagny Island, known to the traditional owners as Nimenba, is an island off the coast of the Kimberley region in Western Australia.

The Aboriginal Australian traditional owners of the area are the Dambimangari peoples of the Worrorran languages group, whose name for the island is Nimenba.

The island was named by Nicholas Baudin in 1801 after the French diplomat and statesman, Jean-Baptiste de Nompère de Champagny, 1st duc de Cadore.

Birds found on the island include the brown quail, eastern reef egret, brown falcon, whimbrel, beach stone-curlew, sooty oystercatcher, bar-shouldered dove, Horsfield's bronze-cuckoo, rainbow bee-eater and the red-capped plover.

The park is the second largest in Western Australia after Shark Bay and links to the Prince Regent National Park. The area also includes Montgomery Reef and St George Basin.

References 

Islands of the Kimberley (Western Australia)